"Carousel" (stylized in all caps) is a song by American rapper and singer Travis Scott featuring fellow American singer and rapper Frank Ocean, released on August 3, 2018 as the second track off of the former's third studio album Astroworld (2018).

Critical reception 
"Carousel" received positive reviews from outlets, with many praising Frank Ocean's contributions to the track. Among them was Spin's Ezra Marcus had heavy praise for Ocean's feature, saying that his "words stand out as an oasis of effortless chill." Roisin O'Connor labelled the Beastie Boys sample as "Superb" and called Ocean's appearance "exquisite, blissful even, as his signature, rich-yet-husky voice floats over delicate chords" Somewhat contrary, while praising Ocean's hook, The Fader's Ben Dandridge-Lemco found the verses to be "Unremarkable".

Controversy 
On September 14, 2018, it was reported that Frank Ocean had filed a cease and desist to get his vocals removed from the song, as it was claimed that his vocals were pitch shifted. Ocean responded to the reports on his Tumblr, saying that he approved of the song's current mix and stated that was not the problem. He explained that it was about social issues relating to sexuality, writing on Tumblr, "THE CEASE AND DESIST WASN’T ABOUT 🔊 IT WAS ABOUT 🏳️‍🌈. ME AND TRAVIS RESOLVED IT AMONGST OURSELVES WEEKS AGO. 💖" Travis Scott confirmed he was on good terms with Ocean in an Instagram post, calling Ocean a "true inspiration in an out of the Stu. Gang."

Charts

Certifications

References

External links
 

2018 songs
Travis Scott songs
Songs written by Travis Scott
Songs written by Frank Ocean
Songs written by Hit-Boy
Songs written by Rick Rubin
Songs written by Ad-Rock
Songs written by Adam Yauch
Songs written by Mike D
Song recordings produced by Hit-Boy